State Route 88 (SR 88) is a  north–south state highway in the Carson Valley in western Douglas County, Nevada, United States. It runs from the California state line along Woodfords Road to U.S. Route 395 in Minden. Prior to 1957, the highway existed as State Route 37.

The highway continues into California as California State Route 88; both highways are closely related. Although Route 88 is a secondary route today, the highway is a historical route from when Carson Pass was a major crossing of the Sierra Nevada.

Route description
The route enters Nevada from California near Woodfords, California. Just after exiting the Sierra Nevada via the Carson River. The road loosely follows the river and the Carson Valley on the western edge of communities of Centerville, Gardnerville Ranchos, and Minden where the highway ends at a Y junction with U.S. Route 395. Despite the fact that California State Route 88 is an east-west highway, Nevada State Route 88 follows a nearly straight north-south path.  There are no curves along its entire length other than at the north end to intersect with US 395.

History

The highway shares much of its history with its California counterpart. Both formed part of a trail that went under such names as "Emigrant Trail", "Kit Carson Emigrant Trail" which has existed since the 1840s. The Carson Pass route was one of two primary divisions of the California Trail. The trail's use diminished with the establishment of the First transcontinental railroad which was completed in 1869 and follows a path closer to modern Interstate 80 across the Sierra Nevada. Newer names for the road have included "Carson Pass Road" after Carson Pass in California.

Woodsford Road first appears on state maps in 1934 as a gravel and graded highway. By 1935, State Route 37 had been established along the roadway. The route remained unchanged until being renumbered as State Route 88 by 1957.

Major intersections

See also

 List of state routes in Nevada
 List of highways numbered 88

References

External links

088
Transportation in Douglas County, Nevada